The 1949 Boston College Eagles football team represented Boston College as an independent during the 1949 college football season. The Eagles were led by sixth-year head coach Denny Myers and played their home games at Braves Field in Boston, Massachusetts. Boston College finished with a record of 4–4–1.

In the annual rivalry game against Holy Cross, Boston College routed the Crusaders 76–0, by far the most lopsided result in the history of the series.

Schedule

References

Boston College
Boston College Eagles football seasons
Boston College Eagles football
1940s in Boston